Carl Donmark Reeves (born December 17, 1971) is a former American football defensive end in the National Football League (NFL). He played for the Chicago Bears. He played college football for the NC State Wolfpack.

References

1971 births
Living people
American football defensive ends
Chicago Bears players
Carolina Cobras players
NC State Wolfpack football players